Open Road Films is an American film distribution and production company. The list also includes the films from the era when the company was known as Global Road Entertainment.

Released

2010s

As Global Road Entertainment

2020s

Upcoming

References

 
Open Road Films